Đuro Ferić, also Giorgio Ferrich, (May 5, 1739 – 1820) was a poet and a Jesuit vicar general of the Republic of Ragusa. 

As a poet, he belonged to the Illyrian circle in Ragusa (now Dubrovnik, Croatia). Illyrian (Slavic) was synonymous with the Croatian language at that time.  His collection of Illyrian fables, published in Ragusa in 1794, bore the Latin title Fabulae ab Illyricis adagiis disumptae, and a second similar text, existing only in manuscript, was titled: Adagia illirycae linguae fabulis explicata. An unpublished collection of his own Slavic poems was titled in Latin: Slavica Poematia Latine reddita.

In the second decade of the 19th century he published in Ragusa two further works in Croatian (Slovinski). Ferić put together a collection of short poems in praise of those Ragusan poets who wrote in the Illyrian language, such as Dominko Zlatarić's translation of Sophocles and Ivan Gundulić's Osman.

See also
Republic of Ragusa

Sources
 Ferić, Đuro

External links 
 Giorgio Ferrich

Croatian Jesuits
People from Dubrovnik
1739 births
1820 deaths
18th-century Croatian people
19th-century Croatian people
18th-century Roman Catholics
19th-century Roman Catholics
Ragusan Jesuits